Borden County High School or Borden County School is a public high school located in Gail, Texas (USA) and classified as a 1A school by the UIL. It is part of the Borden County Independent School District located in central Borden County. In 2015, the school was rated "Met Standard" by the Texas Education Agency.

Athletics
The Borden County Coyotes compete in these sports - 

Baseball
Basketball
Cross Country
6-Man Football
Golf
Tennis
Track and Field

State Titles
Football 
1997(6M), 2008(6M/D2), 2009(6M/D2), 2016(6M/D1), 2017 (6M/D1)
Girls Track - 
2013(1A/D2)
2018 Class A UIL Academic Texas State Champions

References

External links
Borden County ISD

Public high schools in Texas
Schools in Borden County, Texas
Public middle schools in Texas
Public elementary schools in Texas